Nkosilathi Khumalo popularly known as "Diego"  (born 27 May 1979, in Bulawayo) was a former Zimbabwean football player. He was raised in Victoria Falls where he started his football career.

References

Living people
1979 births
Zimbabwean footballers
Zimbabwean expatriate footballers
Zimbabwean expatriate sportspeople in Albania
Expatriate footballers in Albania
Association football midfielders
Kategoria Superiore players
KF Bylis Ballsh players
KF Teuta Durrës players
Njube Sundowns F.C. players
Hwange Colliery F.C. players
Extension Gunners FC players